Hilaroleopsis obesa is a species of beetle in the family Cerambycidae. It was described by Bates in 1881. It is known from Guatemala, Honduras and Mexico.

References

Hemilophini
Beetles described in 1881